Karamay is a prefecture-level city in the north of the Xinjiang Uyghur Autonomous Region, People's Republic of China. The name of the city comes from the Uyghur language and means "black oil", referring to the oil fields near the city.

Karamay was the site of one of the worst disasters in modern Chinese history, the 1994 Karamay fire, when 324 people, including 288 school children, lost their lives in a cinema fire on 8 December 1994.

Karamay is an exclave of Tacheng Prefecture.

History

Subdivisions
Karamay City has jurisdiction over four districts. They are not contiguous as Dushanzi District is located south of the Lanxin Railway and forms an exclave, separated from the rest of Karamay City by Kuytun City. Together with Kuytun City, Karamay City forms an enclave surrounded on all sides by Tacheng Prefecture.

Geography
It borders Hoboksar Mongol Autonomous County to the northeast, Shawan County to the southeast, Toli County and Wusu to the west and Kuytun to the south.

The naturally available water supply in the Karamay area is limited: it mostly consists of two small rivers (the Baiyang River and the Da'erbute River flowing into the Dzungarian Basin from the mountains of its northwestern rim. In addition, the city receives water from the Irtysh River, over the Irtysh–Karamay Canal, which was officially opened in 2008.

A number of natural (Ailik Lake) and artificial (Fengcheng, Huangyangquan) reservoirs are located in Karamay's northeastern Urho District; they all are replenished, directly or indirectly, by water from the Irtysh–Karamay Canal.

Climate 
With monthly percent possible sunshine ranging from 37% in December to 71% in September, sunshine is generous, only occurring less than 50% of the time in November and December and the annual average total is 2,694 hours.

Demographics
According to the 2010 census, over 80% of Karamay's population are Han Chinese, with minorities such as Uighur, Kazakhs, Mongols and Hui making up the rest. The population of 2010 is 391,008, a rise from the 270,232 of 2000 census. The population density is 50.6 inhabitants per km2. The 2015 population estimate is 401,468.

Population by ethnicity (2010)

Economy
In 1955, one of the largest oil fields in China was discovered there. Since then, the city has grown into an oil-producing and refining center.

In 2008 the GDP reached ¥66.1 billion and GDP per capita reached ¥242,391 (US$34,901), ranking first among 659 cities in mainland China.

Transport 
Kuytun–Beitun Railway. There are passenger stations in Karamay itself and in Wuwu New Town, south of central Karamay.
Karamay–Tacheng Railway (under construction as of 2017)
Karamay Airport
China National Highway 217

Notable persons
 Adil Mijit, comedian
 Gulimina Mahamuti, pianist

References

External links

Government website of Karamay (in Simplified Chinese)
Map of the City of Karamay

Populated places in Xinjiang
Prefecture-level divisions of Xinjiang